"Grill, Interrupted" is the nineteenth episode of the sixth season of the American sitcom Modern Family, and the series' 139th episode overall. It originally aired on April 1, 2015. The episode was written by Paul Corrigan & Brad Walsh & Jeffrey Richman, and directed by James Bagdonas.

In the episode, Alex gets accepted at Caltech but is acting weird, making Claire believe that she hasn't praised her enough. The family gathers at Jay's for his birthday, where Phil tries desperately to impress Jay with his gift. Gloria tries to give Manny and Luke a lesson for sneaking booze. Mitchell and Claire decide to give Jay back the money he loaned them a long time ago to help them with their houses, without telling Phil nor Cameron. Andy wants to talk to Haley about his feelings but her coming at Jay's with her new boyfriend makes things a little difficult for him.

"Grill, Interrupted" received positive reviews from the critics.

Plot

Gathering at Jay's (Ed O'Neill) house for his birthday, Claire (Julie Bowen) and Mitchell (Jesse Tyler Ferguson) decide to pay their father back the money he loaned them for the down payment on their respective houses. Mitchell intends on using the money that Cameron (Eric Stonestreet) has received from a recently deceased distant relative, and Phil (Ty Burrell) starts to believe the money problems are what have caused the slight rift between himself and Jay. After Phil's present (a new, state-of-the-art barbecue grill) backfires, he, Claire, Mitchell and Cameron all begin arguing in the driveway about the various monetary issues that have surfaced that day.

Luke (Nolan Gould) and Manny (Rico Rodriguez) come up with a plan to steal and drink a bottle of Gloria's (Sofia Vergara) tequila. Before they can take it, she swaps it out with water so she can teach them a lesson, leaving Luke and Manny suffering a placebo intoxication. When they are "drunk" enough, Gloria makes them believe that the bottle of tequila had a deadly worm inside it that probably got drunk by them. The only way to kill the worm once you had drunk it, is by taking an ice cold bath, something that Luke and Manny rush to do. Gloria appears and takes a photo of the boys being in the tub together, threatening them to post it online if they attempt to steal from her or get drunk underage again.

Meanwhile, Andy (Adam Devine) wants to talk to Haley (Sarah Hyland) about his feelings, since it is the first time he will see her after the events of "Closet? You'll Love It!", where Haley told him that he has a shot with her while she thought he was sleeping. Andy is nervous and Haley appearing with her new boyfriend Will (Nick Ballard) does not help the situation. A series of mishaps leaves Andy and Haley in bed together and, later, Haley removing her clothes due to a drink spillage, but Will does not suspect Andy, nor feeling threatened by him. When Haley leaves the room, Will asks Andy to help him come up with a message for a card for Haley, but once Will leaves Haley struggles to read the handwriting. She asks Andy to read it to her and gets frustrated about how clingy Will is already after only two weeks of dating. Haley kisses Andy on the cheek and heads downstairs, leaving him both disappointed and hopeful.

Alex (Ariel Winter) finds out she has been accepted into Caltech, but she is acting strange after her parents' reaction. Claire blames herself for never praising Alex's achievements because she expects them from her, and begins to overtly praise Alex in front of the whole family, leaving Alex embarrassed and irritated. Jay later finds her with a bottle of tequila, the placebo bottle that Gloria swapped out earlier with water, in his new car in the garage. When confronted, Jay explains the bottle of water in the tequila bottle, commenting that drinking will not help her with her problems. Alex expresses worry about being the least intelligent person at her new college and talks about how scared she is. Jay reassures her that she will do great at college and drives her out of the garage into the yard in front of the bickering family. He tells her that the family needs a leader and one day he will not be around to do it anymore, implying that in the future she will be the one to keep the family in check because she is the only one who can do it.

Reception

Ratings
In its original American broadcast, "Grill, Interrupted" was watched by 9.43; up by 0.72 from the previous episode.

Reviews
"Grill, Interrupted" received positive reviews from the critics.

David Kallison of The A.V. Club awarded the episode with a B+, saying that "Modern Family has no business being as good as it is. [The show] is on a tear of superb episodes lately, starting with the anti-Luddite ode, 'Connection Lost'. What makes this family different from others is the depth and heart the characters possess. The Dunphys et al. are more like, well, a real family. And that makes their schtick last longer". Kallison further went on to praise the season as a whole, saying "This season proves that sitcoms can survive on solid characters and solid jokes. "Grill, Interrupted" lives up to those expectations perfectly".

Ashley Bissette Sumerel of TV Fanatic rated the episode with 4.2/5, saying that this was the kind of episode she liked to see. Sumerel further went on to label the episode "intricate and fun", and also praised Luke, Manny and Gloria's subplot, by saying "In reality, this is a serious topic, and it's nice to see it being dealt with". She closed her review by stating "Overall, this is a really enjoyable, funny installment. It tries to do a LOT, but that's part of what makes Modern Family, well... Modern Family".

Lisa Fernandes of Next Projection rated the episode with 7.6/10, praising the scene between Alex and Jay as "lovely" saying that "Ed O'Neill acts the holy hell out of [it]". Fernandes summarizes her review by stating "Some good moments, the Jay/Alex pep talk and most of the Haley/Andy storyline salvage the episode".

The Christian Post praised the scene between Alex and Jay at the episode's close, saying "As they look at the bickering going on, it's clear that Jay thinks that Alex is more than capable of leading the family one day".

References

External links

"Grill, Interrupted" at ABC.com

2015 American television episodes
Modern Family (season 6) episodes